The Sauer (German and Luxembourgish) or Sûre (French) is a river in Belgium, Luxembourg and Germany.

Rising near Vaux-sur-Sûre in the Ardennes in southeastern Belgium, the Sauer flows eastwards and becomes the border with Luxembourg near Martelange. West of Esch-sur-Sûre it flows into an artificial lake, the Upper Sûre Lake created by the Esch-sur-Sûre Dam, which gives its (French) name to the Luxembourgian commune of Lac de la Haute-Sûre. After flowing through Ettelbruck and Diekirch, the Sauer forms the border between Luxembourg and Germany for the last  of its course, passing Echternach before emptying into the Moselle in Wasserbillig. The rivers Wiltz, Alzette, White Ernz, Black Ernz, Our, and Prüm are tributaries.

References

External links

  The Obersauer Nature Park

International rivers of Europe
 
Belgium–Luxembourg border
Germany–Luxembourg border
Rivers of the Ardennes (Belgium)
Rivers of the Ardennes (Luxembourg)
Rivers of Rhineland-Palatinate
Rivers of Belgium
Rivers of Wallonia
Rivers of Luxembourg (Belgium)
Rivers of Luxembourg
Rivers of Ettelbruck
Diekirch
Echternach
Martelange
Vaux-sur-Sûre
Rivers of the Eifel
Rivers of Germany
Border rivers